The left gastric vein (or coronary vein) is a vein that derives from tributaries draining the lesser curvature of the stomach.

Structure 
The left gastric vein runs from right to left along the lesser curvature of the stomach. It passes to the esophageal opening of the stomach, where it receives some esophageal veins. It then turns backward and passes from left to right behind the omental bursa. It drains into the portal vein near the superior border of the pancreas.

Function 
The left gastric vein drains deoxygenated blood from the lesser curvature of the stomach. It also acts as collaterals between the portal vein and the systemic venous system of the lower esophagus (azygous vein).

Clinical significance 
Esophageal and paraesophageal varices are supplied primarily by the left gastric vein (due to flow reversal) and typically drain into the azygos/hemiazygos venous system.

See also 

 Right gastric vein

References

External links
 

Veins of the torso
Stomach